JaVale Lindy McGee (born January 19, 1988) is an American professional basketball player who plays for the Dallas Mavericks of the National Basketball Association (NBA). He played college basketball for the Nevada Wolf Pack. He was selected 18th overall by the Washington Wizards in the 2008 NBA draft. He is a three-time NBA champion, having won consecutive titles with the Golden State Warriors in 2017 and 2018 before winning a third title with the Los Angeles Lakers in 2020. The son of Olympic gold medalist Pamela McGee, he won a gold medal with the 2020 U.S. Olympic team.

High school and college career
McGee was born in Flint, Michigan, and attended two high schools in Michigan, Detroit Country Day School and Providence Christian, before transferring to Hales Franciscan High School in Chicago. According to Hales Franciscan coach Gary London, McGee's natural position in college was ideally small forward, and he could play both forward spots. McGee was the starting center for the University of Nevada. After his sophomore campaign, in which he averaged 14.3 points and 7.3 rebounds, shooting 53% from the field and 33% from three-point range, McGee decided to hire an agent and declare for the 2008 NBA draft.

Professional career

Washington Wizards (2008–2012)
McGee was selected 18th overall by the Wizards in the 2008 NBA draft. On July 9, 2008, he signed a two-year, $2.4 million deal with the Wizards.

On January 9, 2010, McGee was fined $10,000 by the Wizards for participating in Gilbert Arenas' antics before a game on January 5, 2010, against the Philadelphia 76ers. Arenas was being investigated for a prior incident involving guns in the Wizards' locker room, but made light of the accusations by pointing his finger at his teammates, as if he were shooting them. His teammates were photographed smiling and laughing with him.

On January 6, 2011, McGee was chosen to participate in the 2011 NBA Slam Dunk Contest. McGee was the first Wizard to ever participate in the contest. He finished in second place, losing to Blake Griffin. McGee was the first player to use three balls at one time in a dunk contest, which was later cited by the Guinness World Records as the most basketballs dunked in a single jump. The third ball was passed to him from teammate John Wall.

On March 15, 2011, in a 98–79 loss against the Chicago Bulls, McGee notched his first career triple-double, recording 11 points, 12 rebounds, and 12 blocks. His career-high 12 blocks was the most since Keon Clark had 12 on March 23, 2001. However, he received some criticism for taking ill-advised shots in the fourth quarter to ensure he reached 10 points while his team was being blown out, and even received a technical foul for excessive celebration by pulling himself on the rim after a dunk for his final points. Television commentator Kevin McHale called it a "bad triple-double". In response to the criticism, McGee said, "I got a triple-double. Who can say they got a triple-double? I'm not really worried about it."

During the 2011 NBA lockout, NBPA leaders met with around 30 players on October 14 and stressed unity. McGee left the meeting early and told reporters there were some players "saying that they're ready to fold", but the majority was united. McGee later denied mentioning that players were ready to fold, but his comment was recorded by reporters. Derek Fisher said McGee had "no ability to make that statement" based on the limited time he spent at the meeting.

McGee averaged over 10 points and eight rebounds in 2010–11 and 2011–12 with the Wizards.

Denver Nuggets (2012–2015)
On March 15, 2012, McGee was traded to the Nuggets along with Ronny Turiaf in a deal that sent Nenê to the Wizards. As a member of the Wizards, he started 40 of 41 games in which he appeared; with the Nuggets, he would start in 5 of 20 games in which he appeared. His minutes would also be reduced, averaging 27.4 with Washington but 20.6 with Denver. On March 21, in his Nuggets debut, McGee made the game-winning dunk off an Arron Afflalo missed free throw with 5 seconds left on the clock. At the end of the regular season, the Nuggets earned the West's sixth seed, and McGee appeared in the 2012 NBA Playoffs, which was his first playoff appearance in his career. McGee's series-high was 21 points in Game 5 against first-round opponent Los Angeles Lakers. McGee's numbers were up and down throughout the series, including Game 7, when he scored just 6 points on 1–7 shooting in 32 minutes of floor time. On July 18, 2012, McGee re-signed with the Nuggets on a four-year, $44 million contract.

McGee's 2013–14 season was ended on February 20, 2014, when he underwent surgery to repair a stress fracture in his left tibia in which he sustained on November 8, 2013.

On October 29, 2014, McGee made his return for the Nuggets, recording 2 points and 2 rebounds in the season opening 89–79 win over the Detroit Pistons.

Philadelphia 76ers (2015)
On February 19, 2015, McGee was traded, along with the rights to Chukwudiebere Maduabum and a 2015 first-round pick, to the Philadelphia 76ers in exchange for the rights to Cenk Akyol. On March 1, 2015, he was waived by the 76ers after appearing in six games.

Dallas Mavericks (2015–2016)
On August 13, 2015, McGee signed with the Dallas Mavericks. He missed the team's first 13 games of the 2015–16 season due to a stress fracture in his left tibia. On November 22, 2015, he made his debut for the Mavericks, playing in just under 11 minutes off the bench, recording 8 points and 6 rebounds in a loss to the Oklahoma City Thunder. On January 5, 2016, he recorded season highs of 13 points and 11 rebounds in a 117–116 double overtime win over the Sacramento Kings.

On July 8, 2016, McGee was waived by the Mavericks.

Golden State Warriors (2016–2018)
On September 16, 2016, McGee signed with the Golden State Warriors. On December 15, 2016, he scored a season-high 17 points in a 103–90 win over the New York Knicks. On March 31, 2017, he had 13 points and a season-best five blocked shots in a 107–98 win over the Houston Rockets. The Warriors went on to win the 2017 NBA Championship after defeating the Cleveland Cavaliers 4–1 in the NBA Finals. He played in 77 of 82 regular season games, with a field goal percentage of .652, and 16 of 17 playoff games, with a percentage of .732, both the best in his career.

On August 1, 2017, McGee re-signed with the Warriors on a one-year contract. His playing time increased when he was inserted into the starting lineup after the all-star break. In June 2018, he won his second straight championship after the Warriors defeated the Cavaliers in a four-game sweep in the Finals. He started the final three games of the series, and averaged 8.0 points in the four games.

Los Angeles Lakers (2018–2020)
On July 10, 2018, McGee signed with the Los Angeles Lakers. He missed seven games in December due to a respiratory infection. On March 22, 2019, he had career highs of 33 points and 20 rebounds along with six blocked shots in a 111–106 loss to the Brooklyn Nets.

During the 2019–20 season, McGee played in 68 games and averaged 6.6 points and 5.7 rebounds in 16.6 minutes per game. He earned his third NBA championship with the Lakers in 2020.

Cleveland Cavaliers (2020–2021)
On November 23, 2020, McGee was traded from the Los Angeles Lakers to the Cleveland Cavaliers in exchange for Alfonzo McKinnie and Jordan Bell. On December 23, he made his competitive debut for the team in a 121-114 win against Charlotte Hornets and recorded 13 points and 7 rebounds off the bench.

Return to Denver (2021)
On March 25, 2021, McGee was traded to the Denver Nuggets in exchange for center Isaiah Hartenstein and two future second-round picks.

Phoenix Suns (2021–2022)
On August 16, 2021, McGee signed with the Phoenix Suns.

Return to Dallas (2022–present)
On July 9, 2022, McGee signed with the Dallas Mavericks.

Career statistics

NBA

Regular season

|-
| style="text-align:left;"| 
| style="text-align:left;"| Washington
| 75 || 14 || 15.2 || .494 || – || .660 || 3.9 || .3 || .4 || 1.0 || 6.5
|-
| style="text-align:left;"| 
| style="text-align:left;"| Washington
| 60 || 19 || 16.1 || .508 || .000 || .638 || 4.0 || .2 || .3 || 1.7 || 6.4
|-
| style="text-align:left;"| 
| style="text-align:left;"| Washington
| 79 || 75 || 27.8 || .550 || .000 || .583 || 8.0 || .5 || .5 || 2.4 || 10.1
|-
| style="text-align:left;"| 
| style="text-align:left;"| Washington
| 41 || 40 || 27.4 || .535 || – || .500 || 8.8 || .6 || .6 || 2.5 || 11.9
|-
| style="text-align:left;"| 
| style="text-align:left;"| Denver
| 20 || 5 || 20.6 || .612 || – || .373 || 5.8 || .3 || .5 || 1.6 || 10.3
|-
| style="text-align:left;"| 
| style="text-align:left;"| Denver
| 79 || 0 || 18.1 || .575 || 1.000 || .591 || 4.8 || .3 || .4 || 2.0 || 9.1
|-
| style="text-align:left;"| 
| style="text-align:left;"| Denver
| 5 || 5 || 15.8 || .447 || – || 1.000 || 3.4 || .4 || .2 || 1.4 || 7.0
|-
| style="text-align:left;"| 
| style="text-align:left;"| Denver
| 17 || 0 || 11.5 || .557 || – || .690 || 2.8 || .1 || .1 || 1.1 || 5.2
|-
| style="text-align:left;"| 
| style="text-align:left;"| Philadelphia
| 6 || 0 || 10.2 || .444 || – || .500 || 2.2 || .3 || .0 || .2 || 3.0
|-
| style="text-align:left;"| 
| style="text-align:left;"| Dallas
| 34 || 2 || 10.9 || .575 || .000 || .500 || 3.9 || .1 || .1 || .8 || 5.1
|-
| style="text-align:left;background:#afe6ba;"|
| style="text-align:left;"| Golden State
| 77 || 10 || 9.6 || .652 || .000 || .505 || 3.2 || .2 || .2 || .9 || 6.1
|-
| style="text-align:left;background:#afe6ba;"|
| style="text-align:left;"| Golden State
| 65 || 17 || 9.5 || .621 || .000 || .731 || 2.6 || .5 || .3 || .9 || 4.8
|-
| style="text-align:left;"|
| style="text-align:left;"| L.A. Lakers
| 75 || 62 || 22.3 || .624 || .083 || .634 || 7.5 || .7 || .6 || 2.0 || 12.0
|-
| style="text-align:left;background:#afe6ba;"|
| style="text-align:left;"| L.A. Lakers
| 68 || 68 || 16.6 || .637 || .500 || .646 || 5.7 || .5 || .5 || 1.4 || 6.6
|-
| style="text-align:left;"|
| style="text-align:left;"| Cleveland
| 33 || 1 || 15.2 || .521 || .250 || .655 || 5.2 || 1.0 || .5 || 1.2 || 8.0
|-
| style="text-align:left;"|
| style="text-align:left;"| Denver
| 13 || 1 || 13.5 || .478 || .000 || .667 || 5.3 || .5 || .2 || 1.1 || 5.5
|-
| style="text-align:left;"|
| style="text-align:left;"| Phoenix
| 74 || 17 || 15.8 || .629 || .222 || .699 || 6.7 || .6 || .3 || 1.1 || 9.2
|- class="sortbottom"
| style="text-align:center;" colspan="2" | Career
| 821 || 336 || 17.0 || .576 || .182 || .605 || 5.3 || .4 || .4 || 1.5 || 8.0

Playoffs

|-
| style="text-align:left;"| 2012
| style="text-align:left;"| Denver
| 7 || 0 || 25.9 || .434 || — || .538 || 9.6 || .7 || .7 || 3.1 || 8.6
|-
| style="text-align:left;"| 2013
| style="text-align:left;"| Denver
| 6 || 2 || 18.7 || .581 || — || .389 || 5.2 || .0 || .7 || 1.0 || 7.2
|-
| style="text-align:left;"| 2016
| style="text-align:left;"| Dallas
| 2 || 0 || 7.0 || .500 || — || .333 || 1.5 || .0 || .5 || .0 || 2.0
|-
| style="text-align:left;background:#afe6ba;"| 2017
| style="text-align:left;"| Golden State
| 16 || 1 || 9.3 || style="background:#cfecec;"| .732*|| — || .722 || 3.0 || .3 || .1 || .9 || 5.9
|-
| style="text-align:left;background:#afe6ba;"| 2018
| style="text-align:left;"| Golden State
| 13 || 9 || 12.2 || .672 || .000 || .684 || 3.2 || .3 || .2 || 1.3 || 6.5
|-
| style="text-align:left;background:#afe6ba;"| 2020
| style="text-align:left;"| L.A. Lakers
| 14 || 11 || 9.6 || .625 || .000 || .500 || 3.1 || .5 || .1 || .7 || 2.9
|-
| style="text-align:left;"| 2021
| style="text-align:left;"| Denver
| 4 || 0 || 8.5 || .300 || .000 || .333 || 3.0 || .8 || .3 || 1.3 || 2.0
|-
| style="text-align:left;"| 2022
| style="text-align:left;"| Phoenix
| 12 || 0 || 11.1 || .700 || .000 || .846 || 4.0 || .6 || .3 || .4 || 6.8
|- class="sortbottom"
| style="text-align:center;" colspan="2" | Career
| 74 || 23 || 12.4 || .616 || .000 || .571 || 4.0 || .4 || .3 || 1.0 || 5.6

College

|-
| style="text-align:left;"| 2006–07
| style="text-align:left;"| Nevada
| 33 || 0 || 10.0 || .600 || .667 || .471 || 2.2 || .1 || .2 || .9 || 3.3
|-
| style="text-align:left;"| 2007–08
| style="text-align:left;"| Nevada
| 33 || 31 || 27.3 || .529 || .333 || .525 || 7.3 || .6 || .8 || 2.8 || 14.1
|- class="sortbottom"
| style="text-align:center;" colspan="2"| Career
| 66 || 31 || 18.7 || .542 || .356 || .514 || 4.8 || .3 || .5 || 1.8 || 8.7

National team career

McGee received an invite to the U.S. national team's mini camp in the summer of 2009 and again in the summer of 2010. McGee played with Team USA in a scrimmage at Radio City Music Hall during the 2010 World Basketball Festival but after an uneven performance he did not play in the team's scrimmage against China at Madison Square Garden and was cut on August 15, 2010.

McGee visited the Philippines twice during the 2011 NBA lockout, first in exhibition games with NBA stars against players from the Philippine Basketball Association and the Smart Gilas national team, and then in a basketball clinic. Later that year, he expressed his interest in playing for the Philippine national team, and in 2012, a bill was filed for his Filipino citizenship to make him eligible to play for Smart Gilas. In 2014, McGee was asked again by the Gilas Pilipinas to take part as a naturalized player for the 2014 FIBA Basketball World Cup in Spain. However, national teams were limited to one naturalized player apiece, and former Wizards teammate Andray Blatche made the World Cup team after he was granted citizenship.

McGee and forward Keldon Johnson of the San Antonio Spurs were announced as replacements for Bradley Beal and Kevin Love on the 2020 U.S. Olympic team.  On August 7, 2021, he won an Olympic gold medal after United States defeated France in the final. With the medal, he and his mother, Pamela McGee, became the first mother and son to win gold medals in Olympic history.

Philanthropy
In 2013, McGee started Juglife Foundation, an organization that brings awareness of drinking water and hydration. He has hosted celebrity softball games involving his NBA colleagues. Juglife has partnered with Hope 4 Kids International in building wells in Uganda.

Personal life
McGee's father,  George Montgomery, was a 1985 draft second-round selection by the Portland Trail Blazers, though he did not play for the team. His mother,  Pamela McGee, was a University of Southern California standout, playing with her twin sister, Paula, with them, joined by Cheryl Miller, winning two NCAA Division One championships, in 1983 and 1984. That had followed two Michigan state championships at Northern Flint High School. She won an Olympic gold medal in 1984. Besides playing in France, Italy and Brazil, she was drafted in the 1997 WNBA draft by the Sacramento Monarchs. She starred for the Los Angeles Sparks and Sacramento Monarchs. McGee is the first son of a WNBA player to ever play in the NBA. His younger half-sister, Imani McGee-Stafford, is also a professional basketball player who previously played in the WNBA for both the Chicago Sky and the Atlanta Dream. His mother, with a degree in economics, balanced her international basketball career with raising both children, homeschooling, coaching and teaching school in the offseason, though the formidable tasks were not without controversy. McGee is also cousins with former NFL defensive end Jarron Gilbert.

In 2013, it was announced that McGee would be starring in his own reality television show, Mom's Got Game, with his mother. McGee has been featured regularly on Inside the NBA's basketball blooper feature "Shaqtin' a Fool", earning the nickname "Tragic Bronson", a play on Magic Johnson, from Shaquille O'Neal. McGee has expressed displeasure at his frequent appearance on the segment. McGee became a full-time vegan in the summer of 2017. He had dabbled with the diet for a few years, using it before each season to lose weight. He committed to it full-time after seeing how his body responded during the Warriors' championship season in 2016–17.

McGee is also a record producer under the moniker Pierre. He has a studio in Inglewood and released his self-titled debut album in 2018. In 2020, he co-produced "Available" with Poo Bear and Sasha Sirota on Justin Bieber's record, Changes.

See also
List of National Basketball Association single-game blocks leaders

References

External links

 Nevada Wolf Pack bio (archive, PDF)

1988 births
Living people
21st-century African-American sportspeople
African-American basketball players
American men's basketball players
Basketball players at the 2020 Summer Olympics
Basketball players from Flint, Michigan
Centers (basketball)
Cleveland Cavaliers players
Dallas Mavericks players
Denver Nuggets players
Detroit Country Day School alumni
Golden State Warriors players
Los Angeles Lakers players
Medalists at the 2020 Summer Olympics
Nevada Wolf Pack men's basketball players
Olympic gold medalists for the United States in basketball
Philadelphia 76ers players
Phoenix Suns players
Power forwards (basketball)
United States men's national basketball team players
Washington Wizards draft picks
Washington Wizards players